Jachatira (possibly from Aymara jach'a big, tira cradle, "big cradle") is a  mountain in the Vilcanota mountain range in the Andes of Peru. It is situated in the Puno Region, Carabaya Province, Corani District, west of Corani (Qurani). Jachatira lies northwest of Tarucani in the eastern part of the large glaciated area of Quelccaya (Quechua for "snow plain").

References 

Mountains of Puno Region
Mountains of Peru